The 2018 Bengaluru Open was a professional tennis tournament played on hard courts. It was the second edition of the tournament which was part of the 2018 ATP Challenger Tour. It took place in Bangalore, India from 12 to 17 November 2018.

Singles main-draw entrants

Seeds

 1 Rankings are as of 5 November 2018.

Other entrants
The following players received wildcards into the singles main draw:
  Adil Kalyanpur
  Saketh Myneni
  Sumit Nagal
  Suraj Prabodh

The following players received entry from the qualifying draw:
  Sebastian Fanselow
  Youssef Hossam
  Sasikumar Mukund
  Zsombor Piros

The following player received entry as a lucky loser:
  Zizou Bergs

Champions

Singles

  Prajnesh Gunneswaran  def.   Saketh Myneni 6–2, 6–2.

Doubles

  Max Purcell /  Luke Saville def.  Purav Raja /  Antonio Šančić 7–6(7–3), 6–3.

References

2018 ATP Challenger Tour
2018
2018 in Indian tennis